The General Directorate of Taxation is a  revenue collection agency of the Albanian Government.

Its mission is to collect tax revenues through simple and minimal cost procedures, uniformly applying tax legislation to finance the Albanian state budget.
To achieve these goals, the Directorate assists taxpayers with high quality services so they can fulfill their own tax obligations under the applicable legislation.

The administration is tasked to monitor, evaluate and penalize any conduct by the taxpayer who does not enforce or deliberately misappropriate the fulfillment of their legal obligations.

See also
Taxation in Albania

References

Revenue services
Financial system of Albania
Directorate
Taxation